The 2021 Washington Huskies football team represented the University of Washington during the 2021 NCAA Division I FBS football season. The Huskies were led by second year head coach Jimmy Lake for the first ten games. The team announced a new head coach, Kalen DeBoer, on November 30. The Huskies played their home games at Husky Stadium in Seattle, Washington, and competed in the North Division of the Pac-12 Conference.

Schedule

Game summaries

vs No. 9 (FCS) Montana

Entering the season ranked 20th in the nation, UW struggled immensely in their opener against FCS opponent Montana en route to a shocking 13–7 defeat at the hands of the Grizzlies. Despite entering as 23.5-point favorites over the Griz, the Huskies' offense was shut out for the final 55 minutes of the game, as starting quarterback Dylan Morris tossed 3 picks and zero touchdowns. The Huskies only had 291 yards of total offense. The upset marked only the second time in 20 meetings all-time between the schools that Montana had ever beaten Washington and was also Montana's first win in the series in over 100 years, dating all the way back to 1920. It is also the first time that UW has lost to an FCS opponent.

at Michigan

vs Arkansas State

vs California

at Oregon State

vs UCLA

at Arizona

at Stanford

vs No. 4 Oregon

Arizona State

at Colorado

vs Washington State

Rankings

Coaching staff

References

Washington
Washington Huskies football seasons
Washington Huskies football
Washington Huskies football